Broxton is an unincorporated community in Caddo County, Oklahoma, United States. 

It was originally intended to form an actual town with 50 town lots.

Broxton had an independent school district until the 1990s, but it was consolidated with the Fort Cobb school district, becoming Fort Cobb-Broxton Public Schools

The community of Pine Ridge was also served by the Broxton school district.

Broxton in fiction 
Broxton and the surrounding regions have been an important setting of Marvel Comics' series Thor since the late 2000s. The Norse god Thor's home Asgard became a floating landmass outside of Broxton. Although the Asgardians were welcomed by the locals, in the 2011 miniseries Fear Itself, Odin, resentful of being made the recipient of humans' altruism, and sensing the return of an ancient enemy, leads his people back to Asgard's former location.

See also
List of Oklahoma school districts by county

References

External links
Fort Cobb-Broxton school review at Greatschools.com

Unincorporated communities in Oklahoma
Unincorporated communities in Caddo County, Oklahoma